The Sikkim rat (Rattus andamanensis) is a species of rodent in the family Muridae.

It is found in Bhutan, Cambodia, China, India, Laos, Myanmar, Nepal, Thailand, and Vietnam.  The rat's coloring is brownish upperparts and a white underside
The mitochondrial genome of Rattus andamanensis has 2 rRNA genes, 22 tRNA genes, and 13 protein-coding genes, for a total of 37 genes which is similar to that of other vertebrates

References

Rattus
Rats of Asia
Mammals of Bhutan
Rodents of India
Mammals of Nepal
Vulnerable fauna of Asia
Mammals described in 1860
Taxa named by Edward Blyth
Taxonomy articles created by Polbot